Andrew Fisher (born 15 December 1991) is a Bahraini sprinter, who represented Jamaica until 2015.

At the 2013 Central American and Caribbean Championships he won a gold medal in the 100 metres, with a personal best of 10.07 s in the heats. On July 11, 2015, during the meeting of Madrid, he ran his new best of 9.94. Representing Bahrain, he ran 10.07 in Kingston on May 7, 2016.

He competed at the 2016 Summer Olympics, but was disqualified from the 100 meter sprint during Heat 2 of the Semifinals due to a false start.

References

External links  
 

Living people
1991 births
Place of birth missing (living people)
Bahraini male sprinters
Jamaican male sprinters
Athletes (track and field) at the 2016 Summer Olympics
Olympic athletes of Bahrain
World Athletics Championships athletes for Bahrain
Athletes (track and field) at the 2018 Asian Games
Asian Games competitors for Bahrain